Canindeyú is a department in Paraguay. The capital is the city of Salto del Guairá.
Canindeyú comes from the Guarani words Kaninde - macaw; ju - yellow, blue-and-yellow macaw (Ara ararauna).

Districts

The department is divided in 16 districts:

 Corpus Christi
 Curuguaty
 General Francisco Caballero Alvarez (Puente Kyhá)
 Itanará
 Katueté
 La Paloma
 Nueva Esperanza
 Salto del Guairá
 Villa Ygatimí
 Yasy Cañy
 Ypehú
 Ybyrarobaná
 Yby Pytá
Maracanà
Puerto Adela
Laurel

The eastern part of Canindeyu is very green; mostly rolling hills and soy bean farms.  A fair portion of the population consists of Brazilian immigrants.

See also

 List of high schools in Canindeyú

References